KICW (91.1 FM) is a radio station licensed to Ottumwa, Iowa. The station is owned by the University of Northern Iowa. KICW is an affiliate of Iowa Public Radio, and carries the network's "Classical Network" services.

See also Iowa Public Radio

External links
Iowa Public Radio

ICW
NPR member stations
Classical music radio stations in the United States